Insaf Ho To Aisa is a 1998 comedy Pakistani film directed by Masood Butt, featuring Babar Ali, Reema Khan, Saud (actor), Neeli, Sahiba Afzal, Jan Rambo and Shaan Shahid. 

It was released on 30 January 1998. 

Film music was scored by Tafoo and the film song lyrics were by Saeed Gilani.

References

External links
film Insaf Ho To Aisa (1998) on YouTube

 
Pakistani comedy films

1998 comedy films
1998 films
1990s Urdu-language films